Talk It Out With Jodi Leib is an entertainment program in the nature of on-going special variety, news, music, or comedy featuring celebrity interviews, documentary biographies, live performance, music videos, movies, audience interactivity, and website social networking broadcast over television, satellite, internet, and audio/video media.

Inception 
Talk It Out began after the Columbine high school massacre as a way to create dialogue and community through music and television.

Dedicated to exposing the positive and inspiring leadership qualities at the core of today's popular artists, Jodi Leib began hosting Talk It Out on local cable in Los Angeles and Detroit on a regular basis soon after September 11, 2001.

Programs with up-and-coming artist began airing on a regular basis, which led to an online music magazine featuring a series of print interviews with rising stars and local bands.

Guests 
Jodi Leib hosted Talk It Out sessions with the following artists, musicians, and activists:

 The Black Eyed Peas
 Breaking Benjamin
 Diana
 Hiromi
 Hope
 Indigo Girls
 Janeane Garofalo
 The High Strung
 The Knives
 J. Knox
 Lunarclick
 Stephanie Mardell and Megan Brooks
 Ladell McLin
 Sterling Mire
 Moby
 Randy Nerve
 Royal Crown Revue
 Gloria Steinem
 L. E. Stokes
 Teal
 Tyrese
 The Warlocks
 Brittney Westover
 The Whips
 Joselyn Wilkinson

Work with the Black Eyed Peas 
In 2004, Jodi Leib hosted and produced the episode "Talk It Out with Jodi Leib: On Tour with the Black Eyed Peas", which helped the band launch their breakthrough album Elephunk that featured will.i.am, apl.de.ap, Taboo, and Fergie.  The television program ran in Los Angeles, Philadelphia, and Detroit.  The show also features the music video for Where is the Love?.

Farm Aid 
In 2006, Jodi Leib hosted a Farm Aid session with singer-songwriter Danielle Evin. In the interview, Danielle focuses on the importance of healthful nutrition, organic food and the need for more available health food snacks.

References

External links 
 
 http://www.mtv.com/music/artist/black_eyed_peas/albums.jhtml?albumId=1594666
 Jodi Leib: On Tour with the Black Eyed Peas at MTV

American activists
Take It Out